"Fluffy Bunny" may refer to:

Entertainment
Another term for the eating game, also known as Chubby bunny. 
Characters from the comic strip Pogo, who only appeared in alternate "filler" strips that newspapers were provided if they considered the regular strips too controversial.

Religion
Fluffy bunny - a derogatory term used by Wiccans

Zoology
An affectionate, informal name for a Rabbit